The 2020 NHL Winter Classic was an outdoor ice hockey game played in the National Hockey League (NHL) on January 1, 2020, at the Cotton Bowl in Dallas, Texas. The 12th edition of the Winter Classic, it matched Dallas Stars against the Nashville Predators; the Stars won, 4–2. This was the first NHL outdoor game for both teams. With a sold-out crowd of 85,630, it was the second-most attended game in NHL history.

Background
The league announced on January 1, 2019 that the Cotton Bowl in Dallas, Texas would be the site of the game, with the Dallas Stars as the host team. The league then announced on January 25, 2019 that the Nashville Predators would be the visiting team.

The Cotton Bowl has been the home of the First Responder Bowl, a college football bowl game played on or near New Year's Day, since 2011; to accommodate the Winter Classic, the December 30, 2019 edition of the First Responder Bowl was moved to Gerald J. Ford Stadium in University Park, Texas. The Cotton Bowl previously hosted the Cotton Bowl Classic, another New Year's bowl game, from 1937 to 2009. The stadium has been used for other college football special events such as the State Fair Classic and the Red River Showdown.

On April 23, 2019, the day tickets went on sale to the general public, the event officially sold out, becoming the second-fastest Winter Classic in history to sell out. The crowd of 85,630 became the second-most attended game in NHL history, behind only the 105,491 attendance set at the 2014 NHL Winter Classic.

Game summary
The Dallas Stars defeated the Nashville Predators 4–2 after overcoming a 2–0 deficit. Stars forward Corey Perry received a five-minute major and a game misconduct for elbowing Predators defenseman Ryan Ellis in the head at 2:44 into the first period. Ellis did not return for the rest of the game. The league would later give Perry a five-game suspension.

After Dallas forward Blake Comeau's delay of game penalty at 4:22 gave the Predators a 5-on-3 advantage, forward Matt Duchene scored the icebreaker at 5:46, then defenseman Dante Fabbro gave Nashville a 2–0 lead at 7:36 moments before Perry's five-minute major expired.

The Stars would then score four unanswered goals en route to the win. Comeau would give Dallas its first goal with 1:08 remaining in the second period. Then after forward Colin Blackwell was called for delay of game at 19:11 of the second, forward Mattias Janmark scored the equalizer on the ensuing power play 58 seconds into the third. Forward Alexander Radulov scored a power play goal at 5:06 to give the Stars their first lead, and defenseman Andrej Sekera added his team's fourth goal at 6:35.

Both goaltenders, Ben Bishop of the Stars and Pekka Rinne of the Predators, made 31 saves.

Number in parenthesis represents the player's total in goals or assists to that point of the season

Team rosters

 Juuse Saros and Anton Khudobin dressed as the back-up goaltenders. Neither entered the game.

Scratches
Nashville Predators: Jarred Tinordi, Yakov Trenin, Yannick Weber
Dallas Stars: Justin Dowling, Taylor Fedun

Entertainment
The country music group Midland performed before the teams took the ice. Jake Hoot, the winner of season 17 of the talent competition The Voice, sang the national anthem. The pop music duo Dan + Shay performed during the first intermission. The second intermission entertainment was a tribute to the State Fair of Texas, featuring the SMU Mustangs and Texas A&M Aggies dance teams and a rodeo show.

Television
NBC broadcast the game in the U.S., as it has done since the Winter Classic's first game in 2008. In Canada, Sportsnet televised the game in English, while TVA Sports broadcast it in French. Due to the postponement of the following year’s Winter Classic, and then losing their NHL rights to ESPN/ABC and Turner Sports following the 2021 Stanley Cup Finals, this wound up being NBC’s last Winter Classic. TBS/TNT picked up the rights to the Winter Classic.

Ratings
The 2020 Winter Classic was the least-watched game in the event's history until the 2022 NHL Winter Classic, drawing only 1.97 million viewers. An error in the Nielsen reporting counted the hour-long pregame show as part of the game itself, which appears to be the primary factor in the ratings drop, as the game's primary competition—college football bowl games on ESPN and ABC—also saw lower cumulative viewership (though the two bowls scheduled opposite the Winter Classic individually had higher ratings than the year before, when there were three bowls in the slot). WGRZ in Buffalo, New York was the highest-rated local station, ahead of even Nashville (WSMV) and Dallas (KXAS), both of which set market records for NHL viewership with the contest.

References

 

NHL Winter Classic
Winter Classic
NHL Winter Classic
Ice hockey in the Dallas–Fort Worth metroplex
Sports competitions in Dallas
NHL Winter Classic
Dallas Stars games
Nashville Predators games
Ice hockey competitions in Texas